Chrysopoloma varia is a moth in the genus Chrysopoloma. It is in the family Chrysopolominae.

Distribution 
Chrysopoloma varia occurs in South Africa, Tanzania, Zambia and Zimbabwe.

References 
Chrysopoloma varia Distant, 1899. African Moths. African Moths. Retrieved 18 October 2022.

 Moths described in 1899
Limacodidae
Chrysopolominae